The Holy Family Cathedral is a religious building of the Catholic Church in Banjarmasin in the province of South Kalimantan, Indonesia. It was designed by architect Roestenhurg in a neo-Gothic style.

The cathedral was consecrated June 28, 1931, and follows the Roman or Latin rite. It serves as the cathedral of the Diocese of Banjarmasin (Dioecesis Bangiarmasinus or Keuskupan Banjarmasin), created in 1961 by the Bull "Quod Christus" of Pope John XXIII.

See also
Holy Family Church (disambiguation)
List of cathedrals in Indonesia
Roman Catholicism in Indonesia

References

Roman Catholic cathedrals in Indonesia
Buildings and structures in Banjarmasin
Roman Catholic churches completed in 1931
Churches in Borneo
20th-century Roman Catholic church buildings in Indonesia